Michael Hobbs may refer to:
 Michael Hobbs (British Army officer) (born 1937), former commander in the British Army
 Michael Hobbs (rugby union) (born 1987), New Zealand rugby union player
 Michael Hobbs (actor) (born 1965), British actor

See also 
Jock Hobbs (Michael James Bowie Hobbs, 1960–2012), New Zealand rugby player